Our Pet is a 1924 black-and-white silent short film featuring child star Baby Peggy. It was long thought lost, as are most of the Baby Peggy films, but surfaced in a Japanese auction and was identified in 2016.

Cast
 Baby Peggy as Peggy
 Newton Hall as Peggy's friend
 Winston Radom as Peggy's friend
 Verne Winter as Peggy's friend
 Kenneth Green as Peggy's friend
 Joe Moore as Policeman
 Billy Franey as Thief
 Edna Gregory as Peggy's mother
 Harry Archer as Peggy's father

References

External links

American black-and-white films
American silent short films
American comedy short films
Films directed by Herman C. Raymaker
1920s American films